Philip McGrane is an American politician from Idaho who is serving as the Secretary of State of Idaho. He previously served as the county clerk for Ada County, Idaho. He is a member of the Republican Party. As a candidate for secretary of state, McGrane stated that Joe Biden was the rightful winner of the 2020 United States presidential election, unlike his two main opponents in the primary.

Early life
McGrane is from Boise, Idaho. He earned a bachelor's degree in philosophy from the University of Washington. After graduating, he worked in philanthropy, including with Habitat for Humanity in Alabama. He returned to Boise in 2005 and began working for the Ada County elections office.

McGrane attended the University of Denver's Sturm College of Law and worked as a law clerk for the Election Assistance Commission, an independent federal government agency, in 2010. After he graduated from law school, he became chief deputy clerk for Ada County. McGrane also earned a Master of Public Administration from Boise State University.

Political career
McGrane ran for secretary of state of Idaho in the 2014 elections, finishing in second place in the Republican primary election to Lawerence Denney, and ahead of state legislators Evan Frasure and Mitch Toryanski. McGrane ran for county clerk in the 2018 election, and won.

In June 2021, McGrane announced his candidacy for secretary of state in the 2022 elections. He faced state representative Dorothy Moon and state senator Mary Souza in the primary election. While Moon and Souza both endorsed Donald Trump's false allegations of voter fraud in the 2020 United States presidential election, McGrane acknowledged that Joe Biden was the rightful winner. McGrane defeated Moon and Souza in the primary election, receiving 43 percent of the vote, while Moon received 41 percent and Souza received 16 percent. McGrane faced the Democratic Party nominee, Shawn Keenan, a state committeeman for the Kootenai County Democrats, in the November general election. McGrane received 72% of the vote, while Keenan received 28%.

Personal life
McGrane and his wife, Angella, live in Hidden Springs, Idaho, and have three children. McGrane is a fan of Kansas City-style barbecue. As a pitmaster, McGrane competes in barbecue competitions with his father-in-law, Lou Johnson, with "Phil & Lou BBQ". In 2016, McGrane was inspired by his love of barbecue to introduce mobile voting inspired by food trucks to increase early voting.

Electoral history

References

External links

 

 

Barbecue chefs
Boise State University alumni
County clerks in Idaho
Living people
Idaho lawyers
Idaho Republicans
People from Ada County, Idaho
Secretaries of State of Idaho
Sturm College of Law alumni
University of Washington alumni
Year of birth missing (living people)